Minnesota Valley may refer to:

Organizations 
 Minnesota Valley Canning Company, the former name of vegetable producer Green Giant
 Minnesota Valley Lutheran High School, a private education institution in New Ulm
 Minnesota Valley Wetland Management District, a local government conservation agency
 Minnesota Valley Transit Authority, a public agency in Minneapolis-St. Paul

Places 
 Minnesota valley, the geographic depression area of the Minnesota River in the United States
 Minnesota Valley National Wildlife Refuge, a federally protected area
 Minnesota Valley State Recreation Area, a unit of the Minnesota state park system
 Minnesota Valley State Trail, a multi-use recreation pathway

Minnesota River